Congregational Church of Christ (also known as Congregational Church of Christ at Oberlin or First Church) is a historic church at W. Lorain and N. Main Streets in Oberlin, Ohio. Currently the church is occupied by a United Church of Christ congregation. Richard Bond (architect) did drawing for the church.

The church was built in 1842. For 37 years it was led by prominent abolitionist Charles Grandison Finney, who was also president of Oberlin College. Other abolitionists such as Frederick Douglass and Ralph Waldo Emerson led meetings here. Prominent speakers have included Rev. Dr. Martin Luther King, Booker T. Washington, Mark Twain and President Woodrow Wilson. The Congregational Church of Christ was added to the National Register of Historic Places in 1974.

References

United Church of Christ churches in Ohio
Churches on the National Register of Historic Places in Ohio
Oberlin, Ohio
Greek Revival church buildings in Ohio
Churches completed in 1842
Churches in Lorain County, Ohio
National Register of Historic Places in Lorain County, Ohio